Lucio Morra (–1623) was an Italian bishop and papal diplomat.

Life
Morra, from a noble family in the Kingdom of Naples, was educated at the University of Rome. On 20 November 1606 he was appointed archbishop of Otranto.

On 27 June 1617 Pope Paul V appointed him papal nuncio to the Brussels court of the Archdukes Albert and Isabella, with responsibility for the missions in England and Holland as well as the Catholic Church in the Southern Netherlands. He arrived in Brussels in August 1617.

In 1619 he returned to Italy for family reasons, being replaced as nuncio by Lucio Sanseverino. He died in Italy in 1623.

References

1570s births
1623 deaths
Apostolic Nuncios to Flanders
17th-century Roman Catholic archbishops in the Kingdom of Naples